Fawn Silver is an American actress. She is best known for her role as "Ghoulita", the Black Ghoul, in the 1965 Ed Wood sexploitation film script Orgy of the Dead (directed Stephen C . Apostolif).

Fawn Silver is one of the stars in "The Director of the Dead" Chapter from Jordan Todorov's biography book "Dad Made Dirty Movies" about producer and director Stephen Apostolof, who collaborated with Ed Wood in making "Orgy of the Dead" and other sexploitation films.

Filmography

References

External links
 

American film actresses
Living people
20th-century American actresses
Year of birth missing (living people)
21st-century American women